The 1976–77 County Championship was the 35th season of the Liga IV, the fourth tier of the Romanian football league system. The champions of each county association play against one from a neighboring county in a play-off  to gain promotion to Divizia C.

Promotion play-off 
Teams promoted to Divizia C without a play-off matches as teams from less represented counties in the third division. 

 (AG) Automobilul Curtea de Argeș
 (BN) Hebe Sângeorz-Băi
 (BT) Siretul Bucecea
 (GL) Oțelul Galați

 (IL) Victoria Lehliu
 (SJ) Rapid Jibou
 (VS) Flacăra Murgeni
 (BZ) Petrolul Berca

The matches was played on 10 and 17 July 1977. 

|-
||2–1||0–3
||3–2||0–2
||5–0||2–6
||2–1||0–3
||6–1||1–1
||3–1||0–1
||2–1||1–2
||1–0||1–0
||3–2||0–2
||0–4||0–2
||2–4||0–2
||2–0||1–2
||0–1||1–1
||3–0 ||0–2
||5–1||0–1
||1–0||0–4
|}

County leagues

Arad County 
Seria I

Seria II

Championship final 
The matches was played on 19 and 21 June 1977.

Libertatea Arad won the 1976–77 Arad County Championship and qualify for promotion play-off in Divizia C.

Harghita County

Hunedoara County

Prahova County

See also 
 1976–77 Divizia A
 1976–77 Divizia B
 1976–77 Divizia C

References

External links
 FRF

Liga IV seasons
4
Romania